Wolf Springs is an unincorporated community in Lawrence County, Alabama, United States, located  northwest of Moulton.

History
A post office operated under the name Wolf Springs from 1848 to 1857.
Wolf Springs School, located in Lawrence County Alabama, was built in 1936.  Five acres of land were donated to build the school in order to consolidate Roden, Masterson, Oak Grove and Beaver Cross schools.  The school was  open about 25 years. After the school closed, students were sent to Hatton.  The building was later used as a voting site and a community center where fall festivals, hunting field trials, and family reunions were held.  It is currently empty and has been vandalized.

References

Unincorporated communities in Lawrence County, Alabama
Unincorporated communities in Alabama
1848 establishments in Alabama